On the Rural Route 7609 is a box set by rock singer/songwriter John Mellencamp that was released on June 15, 2010. The first part of the title refers to the song "Rural Route" (which is included in two versions) from his 2007 album Freedom's Road and the fact that Mellencamp's music and lifestyle have always been very rural in nature, and 7609 references that the set spans Mellencamp's entire recording career from 1976 to 2009. Said Mellencamp in the set's liner notes: "I started making records in '76, and the most recent track on the collection was done in '09. So Rural Route 7609; it's like an address. I thought it sounded cool."

The liner notes for On the Rural Route 7609 were penned by veteran rock journalist Anthony DeCurtis, who also wrote the liner notes for Eric Clapton's Crossroads and Billy Joel's My Lives. DeCurtis wrote a 4,500-word essay on Mellencamp, and Mellencamp provides track-by-track commentary.

Summary
This box set contains four discs and 54 tracks and each disc is set up as an individual album with common themes rather than being presented in chronological order. The purpose behind this set is to highlight Mellencamp's songwriting.

While there are many standard album tracks included on the set, there is also quite a bit of previously unreleased material, although no new unreleased songs. Highlights include Mellencamp's newly recorded version of "Colored Lights" (a song he wrote for The Blasters in 1985), "Jenny at 16" (a demo which ultimately became "Jack and Diane"), and recently recorded solo acoustic versions of "Sugar Marie" and "To M.G. (Wherever She May Be)".

Reception

Rolling Stone magazine senior editor David Fricke gave On the Rural Route 7609 four stars in the July 8, 2010 issue. Fricke wrote:

Track listing

Disc one
Longest Days
Grandma's Theme – In the Baggage Coach Ahead (Alternate mix, without simulated record crackle)
Rural Route
Jackie Brown
Rain on the Scarecrow (Rough Harvest version)
Jim Crow - lyrics read by Cornel West **
Jim Crow
Big Daddy of Them All
Deep Blue Heart
Forgiveness
Don't Need This Body
Jenny at 16 (demo) *
Jack & Diane (writing demo)*
Jack & Diane

Disc two
The Real Life - lyrics read by Joanne Woodward **
Ghost Towns Along the Highway
The Full Catastrophe
Authority Song (writing demo)*
Troubled Land
To Washington
Our Country (alternative version)*
Country Gentlemen
Freedom's Road
Mr. Bellows (remixed version) *
Rodeo Clown
Love and Happiness (Rough Harvest version)
Pink Houses

Disc three
If I Die Sudden (live)
Someday
Between a Laugh and a Tear (Rough Harvest version)
Void in My Heart * (Recorded live at Chess Studios in May 1989)
Death Letter
Sugar Marie (2009 acoustic) *
Theo and Weird Henry
When Jesus Left Birmingham
L.U.V.
Thank You
Women Seem
The World Don't Bother Me None*
Cherry Bomb (writing demo)*
Someday the Rains Will Fall (recorded in 2009 in room 636 Gunter Hotel, San Antonio, Texas) on NCIS: The Official TV Soundtrack – Vol. 2 (2009)
A Ride Back Home

Disc four
My Aeroplane
Colored Lights (2009 recording. Written in 1985 for The Blasters) *
Just Like You
Young Without Lovers
To M.G. (Wherever She May Be) (2009 acoustic) *
Sweet Evening Breeze
What If I Came Knocking
County Fair
Peaceful World (acoustic) *
Your Life Is Now
For the Children
Rural Route (alternative version) *

* = Previously unreleased
** = Reading of lyrics

References

John Mellencamp compilation albums
2010 compilation albums
Island Records compilation albums